Franz Werner von Tamm (1658–1724) was a German Baroque painter who travelled to and worked in Italy.

Biography
Von Tamm was born in Hamburg.  According to Houbraken, who called him Joano Vernero Tam in a poem about the members of the Bentvueghels, he joined the Bent with the name "Dapper" and was a good flower painter.

His nickname was "Dapper" or "Aprêt". He was influenced by David de Coninck and became the teacher of Pietro Navarra.  He was in Rome in the years 1685-1695 and is known for still lifes of flowers and hunting pieces. In 1702 he was in Passau and then he moved to Vienna.

He was trained in the studio of Carlo Maratta in Rome. He was invited to Vienna to be a court painter, and remained there until his death.

References

Franz Werner von Tamm on Artnet

1658 births
1724 deaths
German Baroque painters
Artists from Hamburg
Members of the Bentvueghels
Court painters
Flower artists